Puya × berteroniana is a natural hybrid in the genus Puya between the species Puya alpestris subsp. zoellneri × Puya venusta. This natural hybrid is endemic to Chile.

A revision of Puya found that it is likely a hybrid, given its rarity and intermediate characteristics between several species. Additionally, the name Puya berteroniana has been widely misapplied to plants of a different species, Puya alpestris.

References

Chilean Bromeliaceae: diversity, distribution and evaluation of conservation status (Published online: 10 March 2009)

berteroniana
Endemic flora of Chile